An Invitation to Tragedy is the third studio album by American punk rock band Bigwig. It was released on Fearless Records in 2001.

Track list

References

Bigwig (band) albums
2001 albums
Fearless Records albums